Mashidat Gajiyevna Gairbekova (born 29 December 1927 in Karata; died 22 November 2015) was an Avar poet and author. She graduated from the Maxim Gorky Literature Institute, and was first published in 1948. She authored several compilations of poetry, such as "The Word of a Goryanka" and "On the Way to the Top", that sketched life in rural Dagestan.

See also 

 Bulach Tatu
 Avar people

References

Avar people
Poets from Dagestan
People from Akhvakhsky District
1927 births
2015 deaths